Ampthill Rugby Club is an English rugby union team based in Ampthill, Bedfordshire. The club runs six senior teams and the full range of junior sides. The first XV play in the RFU Championship, the second tier of the English rugby union system.

History
In 2013–14, the team finished second but lost the promotion play-off to Darlington Mowden Park of the National League 2 North. In 2014–15, they again finished second having been transferred to National League 2 North. They beat Bishop's Stortford, the National League 2 South runner-up in the promotion play-off at Dillingham Park, 19–10.

For the 2015–16 season Ampthill have agreed a player development programme with Saracens, allowing young players contracted to Saracens to play for Ampthill. Saracens academy manager Don Barell commented: "Saracens are looking forward to having our young players at Ampthill. Ralph Adams-Hale and Billy Walker will benefit from the loan and it will allow the young players to gain the valuable rugby experience that Ampthill can offer. It is a club with good ambition and we are looking forward to seeing them compete in National 1 next season".

Honours
 East Midlands 1 champions: 1989–90
 Midlands 3 East (South) champions: 2006–07
 Midlands Division 2 East champions: 2008–09
 National League 3 Midlands champions: 2012–13
 East Midlands Wells Bombardier Cup winners (6): 1996, 1997, 2003, 2009, 2012, 2013
 National League 2 (north v south) promotion play-off winners: 2014–15
 National League 1 champions: 2018–19

Ampthill were initially National League 3 Midlands champions in 2009–10 but were stripped of the title due to breaches of league rules.

Current standings

Current squad

The Ampthill squad for the 2022–23 season.

References

External links
 Official website

Ampthill
English rugby union teams
Rugby clubs established in 1881
Rugby union in Bedfordshire